Yelena Vladimirovna Kondakova (born March 30, 1957) is the third Soviet or Russian female cosmonaut to travel to space and the first woman to make a long-duration spaceflight. Her first trip into space was on Soyuz TM-20 on October 4, 1994. She returned to Earth on March 22, 1995, after a five-month stay at the Mir space station. Kondakova's second flight was as a mission specialist on the United States Space Shuttle Atlantis during mission STS-84 in May 1997. She was the last Russian woman in space until her successor cosmonaut Elena Serova flew to the International Space Station (ISS) on September 25, 2014.

Personal life 
Kondakova was born in Mytishchi in the Moscow Region of Russia, but grew up near Kaliningrad with an older brother. She married fellow cosmonaut Valeri Ryumin in 1985 and has one daughter with him. She attained her undergraduate degree in the field of mechanical engineering from Baumann Higher Technical School, where she specialized in production of aircraft. She was selected as a cosmonaut candidate in 1989. Kondakova's parents both worked at Energia, and her father was concerned about her taking on role as cosmonaut because he was well aware of the dangers involved. Prior to becoming a cosmonaut, she worked as an engineer for Energia. During her first excursion into space, her husband Valeri would often complain about how he desired a more traditional wife who would take care of the home and family. While Kondakova was away in space during this time, Energia appointed Ryumin to work from home and take care of his daughter until Kondakova's return.

Since 1999, Kondakova has served as a deputy in the Duma, the lower house of the Russian parliament.

Honors 
 Hero of the Russian Federation

See also 
List of female astronauts
Women in space

References

Further reading 
 
 
 Cavallaro Umberto. (2017) Elena Kondakova: The First Woman to Take Part in a Long-Duration Space Mission. In: Women Spacefarers. Springer Praxis Books. Springer, Cham.

External links 

 NASA profile

1957 births
Living people
People from Mytishchi
United Russia politicians
Third convocation members of the State Duma (Russian Federation)
Fourth convocation members of the State Duma (Russian Federation)
Fifth convocation members of the State Duma (Russian Federation)
Russian cosmonauts
Women astronauts
Heroes of the Russian Federation
Space Shuttle program astronauts
Astronaut-politicians
Mir crew members